Latsch is a comune (municipality) in the province of South Tyrol in northern Italy, located about  northwest of the city of Bolzano.

Geography

Latsch (Laces) borders the following municipalities: Kastelbell-Tschars, Martell, Schnals, Schlanders, and Ulten.

Frazioni
The municipality of Latsch contains the frazioni (subdivisions, mainly villages and hamlets) Goldrain (Coldrano), Morter, St. Martin am Kofel (San Martino al Monte) and Tarsch (Tarres)

Gallery

History

Coat-of-arms
The emblem represents a vert centered branch, with three roses of gules and or petal in the center. It is the sign of the Lords of Annenberg owners, from 1312 to 1695, of the castle. The coat of arms was granted in 1930.

Notable people 
 Manfred Fuchs (1938 in Latsch – 2014) entrepreneur and space pioneer

Society

Linguistic distribution
According to the 2011 census, 97.99% of the population speak German, 1.97% Italian and 0.04% Ladin as first language.

Demographic evolution

References

External links
 Homepage of the municipality

Municipalities of South Tyrol